Sankt Thomas am Blasenstein (also St. Thomas am Blasenstein) is a municipality in the district of Perg in the Austrian state of Upper Austria.

Population

References

Cities and towns in Perg District